Roche-a-Cri State Park (from the French for crevice in the rock) is a state park north of Adams and Friendship in central Wisconsin.  The park,  in area, was established in 1948.

The petroglyphs are the only publicly accessible rock art site in the state of Wisconsin. In addition to the petroglyphs, other rock art such as a pictograph of a thunderbird and a horned human figure can be found at the park.

Natural history 
The striking  bluff is a hard core that remains from a larger sheet of Cambrian sandstone which has mostly eroded away.  Around 19,000 to 15,000 years ago it was an island rising above Glacial Lake Wisconsin.  On top of the bluff grow red oak, black oak, white oak, red pine, white pine, and jack pine.  Buzzards also haunt the top.

References

External links 
Roche-A-Cri State Park Wisconsin Department of Natural Resources

Protected areas of Adams County, Wisconsin
State parks of Wisconsin
Protected areas established in 1948
Rock art in North America
1948 establishments in Wisconsin